Verónica Lozano (born May 30, 1970, Bahía Blanca, Argentina) is an Argentine actress and TV host.

Awards

 2013 Tato award as best female TV host

References

Argentine actresses
Argentine television personalities
Women television personalities
People from Bahía Blanca
1970 births
Living people